A commencement speech or commencement address is a speech given to graduating students, generally at a university, although the term is also used for secondary education institutions and in similar institutions around the world.

The commencement is a ceremony in which degrees or diplomas are conferred upon graduating students. A commencement speech is typically given by a notable figure in the community or a graduating student. The person giving such a speech is known as a commencement speaker. Very commonly, colleges or universities will invite politicians, important citizens, or other noted speakers to come and address the graduating class.

A student speaker may deliver remarks either in lieu or in conjunction with a notable outside figure. Student commencement speakers are often valedictorians or may otherwise be elected by their peers to represent the student body.

Despite meaning "beginning", commencement may be mistaken to mean "ending" due to its association with the end of one's studies. Its usage originated with students finishing their studies and being awarded a degree, thus commencing as bachelors or masters in a subject and enjoying new privileges within academia.

Some notable commencement speeches
 Winston Churchill at Harrow School in 1941
 George C. Marshall at Harvard University in 1947: the Marshall Plan
 John F. Kennedy's American University speech in 1963
 Richard Feynman at the California Institute of Technology in 1974: "Cargo cult science"
David Foster Wallace at Kenyon College in 2005: "This Is Water"
Peter Thiel, Hamilton College
 Donald Trump, Liberty University in 2017
Hillary Clinton, Wellesley College in 2017
Taylor Swift, New York University, in 2022

See also
Graduation
Speech

References

External links
 The art of the commencement speech, an archive
 Excerpts from commencement speeches by Steve Jobs, Bill Gates, and J.K. Rowling

Speeches by type
Graduation